Bad Boy Chiller Crew (abbreviated as BBCC) are an English bassline collective from Bradford. 

The group is composed of Gareth "GK" Kelly, Kane Welsh, Sam "Clive" Robinson.

The group began by uploading comedy and prank videos on a Facebook page named "itzmefraz" as far back as 2017. The page was created by Kane and Kieran "Fraz" Durkin. In late 2018, they began to make music as Bad Boy Chiller Crew with early members Fraz, Lewis "Molegrip" Lock and Clive. Kane then became an MC with the group after being in the background, mostly recording videos prior. GK later joined as their DJ (eventually to become an MC) and after internal feuds, Fraz and Molegrip were kicked out of the group in the first half of 2019. 

In December 2019 The Guardian named them as one of their "50 new artists for 2020".

In November 2021, the band appeared in their own 6 episode, self-titled, reality TV series, broadcast on ITV2.

 In early 2020, the group were signed by the London-based record label House Anxiety.

Disrespectful was ranked 10th in The New York Times Best Albums of 2022 by Jon Caramanica.

Discography

Studio albums

Extended plays
 Charva Anthems (14 May 2021)

Singles

As lead artist

As featured artist

References

UK garage groups
Bassline musicians
British musical trios
Musical groups from Bradford
Relentless Records artists
English electronic music groups